The Ballester–Molina is a pistol designed and built by the Argentine company Hispano Argentina Fábrica de Automóviles SA (HAFDASA). From 1938 to 1940 it bore the name Ballester–Rigaud.

History 
The Ballester–Molina was designed to offer the Argentine Federal Police and other armed forces a cheaper alternative to the "Sistema Colt Modelo 1927", itself a licensed copy of the Colt M1911A1, built under the supervision of Colt engineers. Production of the Ballester–Molina began in 1938 and ceased in 1953. The Sistema Colt 1927 was manufactured until 1966, outliving its intended successor by more than two decades.

The company's history dates back to 1929, when two Spaniard entrepreneurs, Arturo Ballester and Eugenio Molina, established a branch of Hispano-Suiza in Buenos Aires, "Hispano-Argentina S.A.". Years later, HAFDASA hired two engineers, Frenchman Rorice Rigaud and Carlos Ballester–Molina, a relative of the founders. Rigaud became the chief designer of the firm, while Ballester–Molina was appointed chief executive officer.

As the Ballester–Molina was designed to serve alongside the Modelo 1927 that was currently in Argentine service, it bears a striking resemblance to the Colt M1911A1. The Ballester–Molina and the M1911 share an identical seven-round magazine, barrel, recoil spring, and barrel bushing. Although many other parts appear identical at first glance, they are not; only the barrel and magazine are interchangeable. The Ballester–Molina is also known as HAFDASA, after the initials of its manufacturer.

Use
The Ballester–Molina was predominantly used by Argentina's security forces. The Argentine Army adopted it as its standard sidearm in 1938. The Ballester–Molina is a short recoil-operated semi-automatic locked breech pistol. The locking system is a near-identical copy of the Model 1911's, with the swinging lock used to unlock the barrel from the slide. The pistol has a two-stage, single action trigger, but unlike that of the 1911 trigger, it pivots rather than slide. The spring housing system is integrated to the pistol frame rather than being a separate part. The hammer is locked by the frame-mounted manual safety, and most notably there is no grip safety. Many examples for sale on the surplus market have seen heavy use but show little internal wear.

About 8000 were sold to the United Kingdom during World War II.

In a September 2007 article in the Argentine gun magazine Magnum, about the British-ordered Ballester–Molina pistols, gun writer and collector George E. Arbones' research and collection data seems to indicate the legend British-bought Ballester–Molinas being manufactured using steel salvaged from the German pocket battleship Admiral Graf Spee after she was scuttled in the River Plate in Montevideo harbor, Uruguay. Another specialist, Alejandro Gherovici, dismissed the legend saying the steel was likely supplied by the US under Lend-Lease. Arbones' article also details the use of those pistols by the British 8th Army and the SOE, and how he came to have his own British-marked Ballester–Molinas. Around 8000 Ballester–Molinas were specially manufactured for Britain during World War II. A number of pistols was issued to agents of the SOE, in order to avoid the use of British weapons for undercover operations in occupied Europe and behind enemy lines. This is very plausible due to the number of pistols of this contract found in the second hand market in France. In 2002 the publication nº150 of the Magnum Magazine written by Santiago P. Tavella Madariaga provides data on this topic. Manufacture of the British Contract Ballester Molina pistol started most likely in 1941 with deliveries ending in 1944. British contract Ballester–Molinas are identified by serial numbers ranging from 8900 to 22.000, marked with a "B" prefix (i.e. B1633) on the right side of the frame in addition to the manufacturer's serial number in the left side of the grip, under the slide and the last three numbers of the serial number marked on the barrel link tab. British Contract B125 displaying HAFDASA Serial Number 9019 is preserved at the Imperial War Museum in Leeds, UK.

Variants
A version of the Ballester–Molina chambered for .22 Long Rifle was manufactured for training purposes. This version was identical externally to the standard Ballester–Molina, except for slide markings indicating the caliber. However, the .22 caliber version is blowback operated to accommodate the less-powerful rimfire cartridge. This version was produced in much smaller numbers and is much rarer today. The Ballester–Molina pistol also came with an extended barrel and a wooden buttstock.

Users

EA
FAA
GNA
PFA
PNA

   Italian Partisans - British-purchased examples supplied to partisans.

See also
Obregón pistol

References

Notes

Bibliography 
 
Hogg, Ian; Gander, Terry Jane's Guns: Recognition Guide London and New York City: HarperCollins Publishers. Fourth Edition, 2005. .
Arbones, Jorge E. "Magnum" Buenos Aires, Argentina magazine: "Ballester Molinas Peronistas y Ballester Molinas Inglesas," September 2007

External links

Hafdasa Website 
Argentina's 1911
User Manual
Euroarms
Argentina's Ballester-Molina pistol

.45 ACP semi-automatic pistols
1911 platform
.22 LR pistols
Hispano-Argentina
Semi-automatic pistols of Argentina
Short recoil firearms
Simple blowback firearms
Weapons and ammunition introduced in 1938
World War II military equipment of Argentina